Ray Johnson (1927–1995) was an American artist.

Ray Johnson or Raymond Johnson may also refer to:
Raymond Johnson (defensive lineman)
Ray O. Johnson, American executive
Ray William Johnson (born 1981), American actor
Ray J. Johnson Jr., comedy character
Ray E. Johnson (1911–1993), California politician
Ray Johnson (American football) (1914–1990), American football player
Raymond A. Johnson (1912–1984), aviation pioneer from Wyoming
Raymond C. Johnson (born 1936), American politician
Raymond Edward Johnson (1911–2001), American stage and film actor
Raymond Eugene Johnson (born 1974), American murderer on Oklahoma's death row
Raymond L. Johnson (born 1943), African-American mathematician
Raymond K. Johnson (1901–1999), American cinematographer and film director
Raymond Jonson (1891–1982), American painter
Ray Johnson (singer)
Ray Johnson, accordionist and fiddler in the Canadian band Buddy Wasisname and the Other Fellers
Ray C. Johnson, Nebraska State Auditor (1939–1971)
Ray A. C. Johnson, Nebraska State Auditor (1971–1991)
Gregory C. Johnson (born 1954), American naval officer and astronaut, known as Ray J